Jaydon McCrary (born July 18, 2007) is an American actor, dancer and singer. He is best known for his turn as Kenny Payne in The Paynes on the Oprah Winfrey Network. He starred in 2019's The Lion King as the voice of young Simba. He is signed to Hollywood Records and released his first extended play Shine, in April 2019. His song "Keep In Touch" was featured in dancing video game Just Dance 2020.

Career
McCrary began his acting career in 2015 at age 8 on K.C. Undercover, where he appeared on two episodes. In December 2016, he made a guest appearance on Childish Gambino's song "Terrified". He then had live performances on Little Big Shots singing The Jackson 5's "I Want You Back", The Ellen Show singing "Who's Lovin' You", and the 60th Annual Grammy Awards to support Childish Gambino's "Terrified". In December 2017, he sang the national anthem before a Los Angeles Clippers game after a viral singing display a few weeks prior. In 2017, he later appeared on I'm Dying Up Here and Teachers as minor roles.

On January 14, 2018 he released his first official single called "Inviting All of You". On August 13, 2018, it was announced that JD McCrary became the youngest artist to sign with Disney Music Group's Hollywood Records, as he released the music video to his second single "My Name" on August 28. On January 24, 2019, he released the first single after signing to the label called "Keep in Touch." He stars in The Paynes on the Oprah Winfrey Network.

In 2019, McCrary co-starred in the Universal comedy film Little, and provided the voice of young Simba in the live action remake of the Disney film The Lion King. McCrary said that "Donald Glover [who voices adult Simba] is so talented that [I] actually did have to take it into consideration, because if Simba is going to grow up to be some sort of figure and you know of it, you have to keep that motive." Also that year, McCrary portrayed a young Michael Jackson in the BET series American Soul, which premiered in February. On April 19, McCrary released his debut EP, Shine, which includes production from Jermaine Dupri and Bryan-Michael Cox.

Artistry
In an interview with Vibe, McCrary cited Michael Jackson as his biggest influence, as well as Stevie Wonder, Bruno Mars, Justin Bieber, and Chris Brown.

Discography

Extended plays

Singles

Guest appearances

Filmography

Film

Television

References

External links
 

2007 births
Living people
21st-century African-American male singers
21st-century American male actors
21st-century American singers
Male actors from Los Angeles
African-American male actors
African-American male child actors
American child singers
American male child actors
American male film actors
American male television actors
American male voice actors
Hollywood Records artists